Governor Colville may refer to:

John Colville, 1st Baron Clydesmuir (1894–1954), Governor of Bombay from 1943 to 1948
Charles Colville (1770–1843), 3rd Governor of Mauritius from 1828 until 1834

See also
Andrew Colvile (1779–1856), Governor of the Hudson's Bay Company from 1852 to 1856
Eden Colvile (1819–1893), Governor of the Hudson's Bay Company from 1880 to 1889